Rexingen may refer to:

Rexingen, Baden-Württemberg, town in Germany
Rexingen, Bas-Rhin, village in France